Trevor Penning (born May 15, 1999) is an American football offensive tackle for the New Orleans Saints of the National Football League (NFL). He played college football at Northern Iowa and was drafted by the Saints in the first round of the 2022 NFL Draft.

Early life and high school
Penning was born on May 15, 1999, in Clear Lake, Iowa. He attended Newman Catholic High School in Mason City, Iowa, where he played football, basketball, and threw discus and shot put on the track and field team. Penning committed to play college football at Northern Iowa shortly after receiving an offer from the team. Penning grew up as a Minnesota Vikings fan.

College career
Penning redshirted his true freshman season at Northern Iowa. As a redshirt sophomore, Penning started all 15 of UNI's games. He started five games at left tackle and one at right tackle during his redshirt junior season, which was played in the spring of 2021 due to the COVID-19 pandemic in the United States. Penning entered the 2021 fall season as one of the highest-rated offensive tackle and FCS prospects for the 2022 NFL Draft. Penning's younger brother, Jared, has been the starter next to him on the Panthers' offensive line since his redshirt sophomore season.

Professional career

New Orleans Saints
Penning was selected with the 19th overall pick by the New Orleans Saints in the 2022 NFL Draft. He was placed on injured reserve on September 1, 2022. He was activated on November 26.

References

External links 
 New Orleans Saints bio
Northern Iowa Panthers bio

1999 births
Living people
American football offensive tackles
Players of American football from Iowa
Northern Iowa Panthers football players
People from Clear Lake, Iowa
New Orleans Saints players